John Watt Beattie (15 August 1859 – 24 June 1930) was an Australian photographer.

Beattie was born in Aberdeen, Scotland.  He was elected as a fellow of the Royal Society of Tasmania in 1890.  He was appointed Photographer to the Government of Tasmania on 21 December 1896.
He did extensive photography around Tasmania, as well as in the Central Highlands and on the West Coast of Tasmania. He was employed by North Mount Lyell to photograph between Gormanston and Kelly Basin in the 1890s.

Beattie travelled with lantern slide shows on various subjects – "A trip through Tasmania", "From Kelly's Basin to Gormanston", as well as  "Port Arthur and Tasman Peninsula", the photographs frequently published posthumously in Walkabout, and his images of places such as Port Arthur and the Isle of the Dead were used as postcards in the early twentieth century. 

Beattie's work was notable in that it crystallised around a Romantic tradition that promoted a sympathetic orientation to the natural world. His sublime pictures of Tasmanian wilderness and Port Arthur in particular helped settlers and activists argue for the protection of nature through the 1890s and into the twentieth century.

In the 1890s he also prepared composite pictures of the Governors of Tasmania 1804–1895, as well as Parliamentarians of Tasmania 1856–1895.

He also travelled to Norfolk Island and did photographic work there as well. He died in Hobart in 1930.

See also
 Photography in Australia 
 Cinema of Australia
 William Bland 
 Jeff Carter (photographer)
 Jack Cato
 Maggie Diaz 
 Ken G. Hall 
 Frank Hurley 
 Charles Kerry 
 Henry King (photographer)
 David Perry (Australian filmmaker) 
 Ruby Spowart 
 Mark Strizic

References

External links

 Australian Dictionary of National Biography entry
 Journal of a Voyage to the Western Pacific in the Melanesian Mission Yacht Southern Cross 25 August-10 November 1906
 Catalogue of a Series of Photographs Illustrating the Scenery and Peoples of the Islands in the South and Western Pacific. Photographed and published by J. W. Beattie, 1907.
  Photograph of Beattie late in life
 Works by Beattie are held in the collection of Auckland War Memorial Museum Tamaki Paenga Hira

Further reading
Tassell, Margaret and Wood, David (1981) Tasmanian Photographer – From the John Watt Beattie Collection – From the Collections of the Queen Victoria Museum and Art Gallery South Melbourne, Macmillan Company of Australia. .

1859 births
1930 deaths
Photographers from Tasmania
History of Norfolk Island
People from Hobart
19th-century Scottish photographers
19th-century Australian photographers
20th-century Australian photographers